Windbury Head is the site of an Iron Age hill fort on the Hartland Peninsula, just north of Clovelly in North Devon, England.

References

Hill forts in Devon